Sir Thomas Hutchinson (4 September 1589 – 18 August 1643) was an English MP.

He was born at Owthorpe, Nottinghamshire, the family estate in Nottinghamshire, the son of Thomas Hutchinson of Cropwell Butler and Lady Jane Sacheverell. He became Lord of Radcliffe. He was educated at the University of Cambridge in Pembroke College, which he entered in 1606, and studied law at Gray's Inn which he entered in 1609.

He had succeeded to his father's estates as a minor in 1599. In 1613, he was attacked in London when alighting from a Thames boat by a guardian who cut off two or three of Hutchinson's fingers. Helped by a waterman, Hutchinson retaliated, biting a greater part of his assailant's nose off.
 
He was knighted at Hitchinbrook in 1617 by King James I and appointed High Sheriff of Nottinghamshire in 1620.

He was elected MP for Nottinghamshire in 1626 and again to the Short and Long Parliaments of 1640. He was a close friend of the King who gave him many important missions as a trusted friend.

His first marriage was to Lady Margaret Byron, daughter of Sir John Byron Jr, of Clayton and later Newstead Abbey and Lady Margaret FitzWilliams. His second marriage was to Lady Catherine Stanhope of Shelford. She was the daughter of Sir John Stanhope and Lady Catherine Trentham.

He died in London in 1643 aged 53 and was buried at the church of St Paul's, Covent Garden.

Family
Married Alice Ingoldsby, daughter of George and Mary Ingoldsby.  Children:  

 Richard Hutchinson who married Alice Bosworth. They were early settlers in the Americas arriving in 1634

Married Lady Margaret Byron. Children:

 John Hutchinson (colonel) who married Lucy Apsley; great grandparents of Elizabeth {Hutchinson} Jackson mother of President Andrew Jackson
 George Hutchinson who married Lady Barbara Apsley

Married Lady Katherine Stanhope 1631 of Shelford. Children
 Charles Hutchinson (M.P.) was a M.P. as well as a  Deputy Lieutenant of Nottinghamshire in 1694 who married Isabella Boteler.
 Stanhope Hutchinson
 Isabella Hutchinson who married Charles Cotton

References

External links

1580s births
1643 deaths
People from Rushcliffe (district)
High Sheriffs of Nottinghamshire
English MPs 1626
English MPs 1640 (April)
English MPs 1640–1648
Alumni of Pembroke College, Cambridge